Yana Yaku (Quechua yana black, yaku water, "black water", Hispanicized spelling Yanayacu) is a mountain in the northern part of the Cordillera Negra in the Andes of Peru, about  high. It is situated in the Ancash Region, Santa Province, Cáceres del Perú District. Yana Yaku lies between Qarwaqucha in the southeast and Quñuqranra in the northwest, west of Rumi Cruz.

Sources 

Mountains of Peru
Mountains of Ancash Region